Taha Basry (2 October 1946 – 2 April 2014) was an Egyptian professional football player and manager.

Playing career
Basry played as a midfielder for Zamalek SC and the Egypt national football team. He played for Egypt at the 1970, 1974 and 1976 African Cup of Nations, where he scored a total of 4 goals.
He played many years in the early seventies for Al-Arabi club in the Kuwaiti Premier League.

Club career statistics

Career as manager
Manager of Egyptian national team in 1987 FIFA U-17 World Cup
Previous manager of Egyptian national team in 1987 FIFA U-17 World Cup
Previous Manager of Zamalek, Ghazl El Mahalla, ENPPI & Al Moqaweloon Al Arab
Previous Manager of Ismaily
Manager of Al-Ittihad Al-Sakndary from 2008 to 2009

Personal Titles
Best Egyptian Manager 2003 (By Egyptian Football Association)

Titles as a player for National Team
3rd Place in African Cup of Nations twice 1970-1974
4th Place in African Cup of Nations 1976

3 Titles as a player for Zamalek

1 Egyptian League Titles for Zamalek
2 Egyptian Cup Titles for Zamalek

1 Titles as a Manager
1 Egyptian Cup Title for ENPPI  2004-2005

References

External links
 

1946 births
Zamalek SC players
Egyptian footballers
Egypt international footballers
1970 African Cup of Nations players
1974 African Cup of Nations players
1976 African Cup of Nations players
Egyptian football managers
Zamalek SC managers
ENPPI SC managers
Al Ittihad Alexandria Club managers
Ismaily SC managers
2014 deaths
Egyptian Premier League players
Association football midfielders
Al Mokawloon Al Arab SC managers